Carrick Castle is a 14th-century tower house on the west shore of Loch Goil on the Cowal peninsula in Argyll and Bute, Scotland.

The castle stands on a rocky peninsula, and was formerly defended to landward by a ditch and drawbridge. It consists of two floors above the central great hall and stands 64 feet high. There is a curiosity – a small chimney is built into a window recess. There is an appendage of a smaller 17th Century structure to the original rectangular tower house. The structure has been designated a scheduled monument and a Category A listed building by Historic Environment Scotland.

Modern-day houses in the surrounding area take the name Carrick Castle.

History

The castle was probably built by the Campbells in the last decades of the fourteenth century, at a point of time when the family was dominant in the area.

It was used as a hunting lodge by James IV. Mary, Queen of Scots visited in 1563.

During Argyll's Rising in 1685, when Archibald Campbell, 9th Earl of Argyll, attempted to overthrow King James VII, captain Thomas Hamilton of HMS Kingfisher reported that the castle had been burnt and walls reduced sufficiently to make it useless to the Campbell forces. Legend has it that the ship bombarded the castle, badly damaging the keep, which lost its roof.

The castle was intermittently occupied until it was sold to the Murrays, the Earls of Dunmore.

The keep was a ruin for many years but is now in private ownership and undergoing restoration.

Notes and references

External links

Castles in Argyll and Bute
Listed castles in Scotland
Category A listed buildings in Argyll and Bute
Scheduled Ancient Monuments in Argyll and Bute
Tower houses in Scotland
Hunting lodges in Scotland